Carl Nick Ciarfalio (born November 12, 1953) is an American actor and stuntman. He has appeared in over 300 film and television projects. He is best known for portraying the Thing in the Roger Corman produced, but unreleased movie The Fantastic Four.

Career
Carl Ciarfalio started his career as a plumber's associate when he was invited by one of his wrestling associates to join him at Knott's Berry Farm as they were looking for big and tall actors to perform for audiences. Ciarfalio took the job for the summer, but he found himself enjoying it. "[W]ithin a couple of months I had a cowboy hat and a gun and I was on stage and people were applauding and laughing, and I told my parents, 'I'll go back to school one day'." He never did. He began appearing in numerous film and television projects over the years such as Fight Club, Mission: Impossible III and The Amazing Spider-Man.

In 1993, Ciarfalio received a call to appear in a Roger Corman production. "They were looking for a stunt man. They were looking for somebody about six feet tall and weighed about 220 pounds or so...So, I went to the audition and we talked a little bit and they thought I was the guy, which was, you know, very cool." While the actor who was playing Ben Grimm (Michael Bailey Smith) was tall, he was unable to fit in the Thing suit and thus Ciarfalio found himself wearing the costume which he found "the hottest fucking thing" he ever wore.

On October 20, 2014, Ciarfalio launched a Kickstarter campaign to have a biography book published. He reached his goal at $11,055 and in September 2015 published Stars, Stunts and Stories: A Hollywood Stuntman's Fall to Fame. The book was co-written by Teri Ryan.

Filmography

Stunts

Actor

References

External links

Living people
1953 births
American stunt performers
Male actors from California
American people of Italian descent